The 1948–49 UCLA Bruins men's basketball team represented the University of California, Los Angeles during the 1948–49 NCAA men's basketball season and were members of the Pacific Coast Conference. The Bruins were led by first year head coach John Wooden. They finished the regular season with a record of 22–7 and were southern division champions with a record of 10–2.

Previous season

The Bruins finished the season 12–13 overall and were third in the PCC South Division with a record of 3–9. At the end of the season, head coach Wilbur Johns retired and become UCLA's athletic director. John Wooden was hired as Johns' successor in April 1948.

Roster

Schedule

|-
!colspan=9 style=|Regular Season

|-
!colspan=9 style=|Conference Championship

Source

Rankings

References

UCLA Bruins men's basketball seasons
Ucla
UCLA Bruins Basketball
UCLA Bruins Basketball